The Voice of Ireland was an Irish reality talent show which is broadcast by RTÉ. In June 2015, it was confirmed by the programme's broadcaster RTÉ that the show would be recommissioned for a fifth series, despite speculation of its axing for Syco Productions' Ireland's Got Talent. The Voice of Ireland continued to be produced by Screentime ShinAwiL Productions, and filmed in The Helix.

It was confirmed that Una Healy of The Saturdays would return, alongside former S Club 7 member Rachel Stevens, Kian Egan and Bressie.

Michael Lawson from Team Bressie won the title with Kelesa Mulcahy from Team Kian as runner-up and Nigel Connell from Team Una third.

Teams
Color key

Blind auditions

Episode 1 (3 January)

Episode 2 (10 January)

Episode 3 (17 January)

Episode 4 (24 January)

Episode 5 (31 January)

The Battles

The Knockouts

The Live Shows

References

5
2016 Irish television seasons